Namyangju is a city in Gyeonggi Province, South Korea. To the east is Gapyeong County, to the west is Guri City, and to the north is Pocheon City. Namyangju-si was originally a southern part of Yangju-gun, but was separated into Namyangju-gun in April 1980. In 1995, Migeum-si and Namyangju-gun were merged to form an urban and rural complex. The city hall is located in Geumgok-dong and Dasan-dong, and the administrative districts are 6-eup, 3-myeon, and 7-dong.

History of Namyangju
Namyangju historical character: Jeong Yak-yong, also Jeong Yag-yong or Dasan[] (1762–1836), was a leading Korean philosopher during the Joseon Dynasty. He is widely regarded as the greatest of the Silhak thinkers, who advocated that the formalist Neo-Confucian philosophy of Joseon return to practical concerns. Jeong Yag-yong and his brothers were also among the earliest Korean converts to Roman Catholicism.
Jeong was born, and also ended his days, in modern-day Namyangju, Gyeonggi province

 1950 October to early 1951 Namyangju Massacre.
 1980 April 1 Namyangju County was made with Guri-eup, Migeum-eup, Jinjeob-myeon, Jingeon-myeon, Hwado-myeon, Sudong-myeon, Wabu-myeon, and Byeolnae-myeon (2 eup, 6 myeon)
 1980 December 1 Wabu-myeon became Wabu-eup (3 eup, 5 myeon)
 1983 February 15 Jingeon-myeon Yangji-ri, Onam-ri, Palheon-ri were absorbed by Jinjeob-myeon
 1986 January 1 Guri-eup became Guri City (2 eup, 5 myeon)
 1986 April 1 Wabu-eup Joan branch office became Joan-myeon (2 eup, 6 myeon)
 1989 January 1 Migeum-eup became Miguem City (1 eup, 6 myeon)
 1989 April 1 Jinjeob-myeon became Jinjeob-eup (2 eup, 5 myeon)
 1989 April 1 Toegyewon branch office became Toegyewon-myeon (2 eup, 6 myeon)
 1991 December 1 Hwado-myeon became Hwado-eup (3 eup, 5 myeon)
 1992 April 1 In Jinjeob-eup, Onam branch office opened.
 1995 January 1 Migeum City and Namyangju County were merged. (3 eup, 5 myeon, 6 dong)
 1995 May 6 Onam branch office became Onam-myeon (3 eup, 6 myeon, 6 dong)
 2001 September 12 Jingeon-myeon became Jingeon-eup (4 eup, 5 myeon, 6 dong)
 2001 September 12 Onam-myeon became Onam-eup (5 eup, 4 myeon, 6 dong)
 2005 June 1 In Byeolnae-myeon, Cheonghak branch office opened.
 2006 January 20 Pungyang branch office opened; It has jurisdiction over Onam-eup, Jinjeob-eup, Toegyewon-myeon, Byeolnae-myeon
 2006 November 20 In Hwado-eup, Dongbu branch office opened.
 2008 October 7 The population reached 500,000 (the 13th city in South Korea to do so).
 2009 December 14 Cheonghak branch office closed.
 2011 September Namyangju Organic Museum opened, world's first museum of organic agriculture.

Administrative divisions
 5 Eup
-Hwado
-Jinjeob
-Jingeon
-Onam
-Wabu
-Toegyewon
 3 Myeon
-Byeolnae
-Joan
-Sudong
 7 Dong
-Byeolnae
-Dasan 1
-Dasan 2 - Suseok, Donong, Jigeum
-Geumgok
-Hopyeong
-Pyeongnae
-Yangjeong - Ilpae, Ipae, Sampae

Location
Namyangju is a northeastern city which is part of the ring around Seoul. Seoul Ring Expressway passes through.

Jungang Line passes through Namyangju. - Donong station, Yangjeong station, Dukso station, Dosim station, Paldang station, Ungilsan station

A refurbished Gyeongchun Line reopened in late 2010 - Byeollae, Toegyewon, Sareung, Geumgok, Pyeongnae-hopyeong, Maseok stations are in Namyangju.

The Transportation and Construction Committee of the National Assembly has approved that Line 4 will be extended from Danggogae to Jinjeop, Namyangju.

The 2012 Munhwa Broadcasting Corporation drama Arang and the Magistrate, starring Lee Joon-gi, Shin Min-ah and Yeon Woo-jin, were filmed on location in Namyangju.

Climate
Namyangju has a monsoon-influenced humid continental climate (Köppen: Dwa) with cold, dry winters and hot, rainy summers.

Education
There are 2 campuses of Gyeong Hee graduate school and Gyeong bok college, 15 high schools, 29 middle schools, and 55 elementary schools.

Historic landmarks
Namyangju is the location of the UNESCO World Heritage-listed Hongneung and Yureung Imperial Tombs, the final resting place of the 20th-century emperors Gojong and Sunjong and their families. 

The royal tomb of Princess Hwahyeop, a Joseon dynasty princess, was discovered in Sampae-dong in 2015. Excavations in 2016 unearthed stone tablets detailing eulogies to her written by King Yeongjo, Crown Prince Sado, and King Jeongjo.

Namyangju Organic Museum
Namyangju is rapidly developing a reputation as a regional centre of excellence for organic farming. The Namyangju Organic Museum, the world's first museum dedicated to the history and development of organic agriculture,  opened in September 2011. It is located west of Seoul and on the shores of the River Han. The museum caters for young and old, it includes a timeline of organic farming developments, and there are exhibits of traditional Korean farming practices tied to the 24 seasonal divisions of the year. The museum's opening coincided with Namyangju hosting the 17th IFOAM Organic World Congress.

Products
Sweet pears grown in Namyangju are exported to the United States, Japan, and Canada. Organic vegetables are cultivated with ecofriendly methods.

Gorosoei is a special product made in the Namyangju area. It is medicinal water which has abundant minerals.

The term "Gorosoei" comes from "Gollisu" meaning "water for bones." The sap is extracted at Sudong-Myeon, Mountain Jugeum in Mount Chungnyeong Natural Recreation Forest, Mount Cheonma in Palhyeon and Onam township.

Twin towns – sister cities

Namyangju is twinned with:

 Changzhou, China
 Dartford, England, United Kingdom
 Gangjin, South Korea
 Jeongeup, South Korea
 Kampong Cham, Cambodia
 Sacheon, South Korea
 Vinh, Vietnam
 Yeongwol, South Korea

Notable people
 BoA – singer, songwriter, record producer and actress
 Lee Kwang-soo – actor, entertainer and model
 Jeon Hye-bin – actress, singer and model, former member of K-pop girl group Luv
 Huh Chan-mi – singer, dancer and actress, former member of K-pop groups Coed School and F-ve Dolls
 Yugyeom – singer and rapper, member of K-pop boy band Got7
 Han Groo – actress and singer
 Hoshi – singer, dancer and songwriter, member of K-pop boy band Seventeen
 Sunghoon – singer and former figure skater, member of K-pop boy band Enhypen
 Fleta – professional Overwatch League player
 Yeo Hoon-min – singer, dancer and actor, member of K-pop boy band U-KISS
 Oh Hyeon-gyu – footballer

See also
 List of cities in South Korea

References

External links
City government website 
City Council website 

 
Cities in Gyeonggi Province
Museums in South Korea
Museums